Élisabeth Vergelat, later Desvernois, was a French painter active in Switzerland.

Vergelat is known to have been a painter of miniatures and pastellist. With her husband, the painter , she lived in Geneva in 1787 and 1788. The couple's son, Joseph-Eugène Desvernois, would also become a painter and draughtsman; he was born in Lausanne in 1790. Little else is recorded of her career.

References

French women painters
Portrait miniaturists
Pastel artists
18th-century French painters
18th-century French women artists
French expatriates in Switzerland